The 2019 Gree China Cup International Football Championship (Chinese: 2019 年格力中国杯国际足球锦标赛) was the third edition of the China Cup, an international football tournament held in China annually. It took place from 21 to 25 March 2019 in Nanning, Guangxi, China.

Participating teams
On 11 February 2019, it was announced that Thailand, Uruguay and Uzbekistan would participate in the 2019 China Cup.

Venues

Match officials
The following referees were chosen for the 2019 China Cup.
Referees

  Ma Ning
  Milorad Mažić
  Salman Ahmad Falahi
  Mohammed Al-Shammari

Assistant referees

  Cao Yi
  Zhang Cheng
  Mohammad Darman
  Yousuf Al-Shamari

Squads

China PR

Coach:  Fabio Cannavaro

Source:

Thailand

Coach:  Sirisak Yodyardthai (caretaker)

 
 

 

Source:

Uruguay

Coach:  Óscar Tabárez

Source:

Uzbekistan

Coach:  Héctor Cúper

Source:

Matches
All times are local, CST (UTC+8).

Bracket

Semi-finals

Third-place playoff

Final

Goalscorers

Notes

References

External links
 

2019
International association football competitions hosted by China
2019 in association football
Sport in Guangxi
Nanning
2019 in Chinese football
March 2019 sports events in China